The 2019 South Sudan Football Championship (also called the 2019 South Sudan Champions League or 2019 South Sudan Premier League) was the 5th season of the South Sudan Football Championship, the top-level football championship of South Sudan.

Group stage
Teams that qualified as local league champions were divided into three groups: Group A in Juba, Group B in Wau, and Group C in Malakal. The group stage kicked off on 20 May 2019.

The winners of each group advance to the Championship playoff.

Group A

Group B

Group C

Championship playoff
Played between 8 and 12 June 2019 at Wau Stadium.

Championship playoff clubs' stadiums

See also
2019 South Sudan National Cup

References

External links
South Sudan Football Association Facebook page

Football leagues in South Sudan
Premier League
South Sudan